Matthew Arias also known by his stage name Matteo (born February 11, 1991) is an Emmy award-winning Los Angeles-based musician and film editor. Arias was born in Monterey County, California, in 1991 but spent most his childhood in the Los Angeles suburb of Claremont.

Music 
Arias is a multi-instrumentalist active since 2009. He has toured the US multiple times and collaborated with brands such as Urban Outfitters and American Apparel. Past bands include Golden Animals, Vox Waves and Slow White. Arias joined Vox Waves in 2012 and the band signed to singer Scott Weiland's label, Softdrive Records, but due to circumstances surrounding Weiland's death the band never released their debut album. In 2016, Arias joined the band Golden Animals and remained a member until 2018. In 2019 Arias toured with Los Angeles band Mystic Braves during their international tours through the US and Europe. In 2018 Arias started his own group Windows who released their first singles in summer of 2020. In February of 2023 the band released two additional studio singles.

Film and Television 

Arias began working in the film and TV industry in 2011, when he started editing Spanish language television programs at Estrella TV and later switching to the English market with a break at Fuse TV. In 2015 he began as a freelance editor for NBC Universal. He has been Emmy  nominated several times and has won two Emmy's respectively in 2017 and 2019 for his work editing in-depth investigative journalism with NBC 4. In addition, he has been nominated for – and received – multiple Golden Mike Awards and a Humane Society Genesis Award in 2019 for his work in the news industry. He is an active member of the Academy of Television Arts & Sciences.

References  

1991 births
Living people
American male musicians
Hispanic and Latino American musicians
Musicians from Los Angeles
American people of Mexican descent
American film editors
People from Claremont, California